The 190th New York State Legislature, consisting of the New York State Senate and the New York State Assembly, met from January 6, 1993, to December 31, 1994, during the eleventh and twelfth years of Mario Cuomo's governorship, in Albany.

Background
Under the provisions of the New York Constitution of 1938 and the U.S. Supreme Court decision to follow the One man, one vote rule, re-apportioned in 1992 by the Legislature, 61 Senators and 150 assemblymen were elected in single-seat districts for two-year terms. Senate and Assembly districts consisted of approximately the same number of inhabitants, the area being apportioned contiguously without restrictions regarding county boundaries.

At this time there were two major political parties: the Democratic Party and the Republican Party. The Conservative Party, the Right to Life Party, the Liberal Party, the Libertarian Party, the New Alliance Party, the Natural Law Party, and the Socialist Workers Party also nominated tickets.

Elections
The New York state election, 1992, was held on November 3. The only statewide elective office up for election was a U.S. Senator from New York. Republican Al D'Amato was re-elected with Conservative and Right-to-Life endorsement. The approximate party strength at this election, as expressed by the vote for U.S. Senator, was: Democrats 2,943,000; Republicans 2,653,000; Conservatives 289,000; Right to Life 225,000; Liberals 143,000; Libertarians 109,000; New Alliance 57,000; and Socialist Workers 17,000.

25 of the sitting 28 women members of the legislature—State Senators Nancy Larraine Hoffmann (Democrat), of Syracuse; Olga A. Méndez (Democrat), of East Harlem; Velmanette Montgomery (Democrat), of Brooklyn; Suzi Oppenheimer (Democrat), of Mamaroneck; and Ada L. Smith (Democrat), of Queens; and State Representantatives Nancy Calhoun (Republican), of Blooming Grove; Joan Christensen (Democrat), of Syracuse; Barbara M. Clark (Demo6), of Queens; Elizabeth Connelly (Dem.), of Staten Island; Vivian E. Cook (Democrat) of Queens; Gloria Davis (Democrat), of the Bronx; Eileen C. Dugan (Democrat), of Brooklyn; Deborah J. Glick (Democrat), of Manhattan; Aurelia Greene (Democrat), of the Bronx; Earlene Hill Hooper (Dem.), of Hempstead; Rhoda S. Jacobs (Democrat), of Brooklyn; Cynthia Jenkins (Dem.), a librarian of Queens; Susan V. John (Democrat), of Rochester; Nettie Mayersohn (Democrat), of Queens; Patricia McGee (Rep.), of Franklinville; Catherine Nolan (Democrat), of Queens; Audrey Pheffer (Democrat), of Queens; Cecile D. Singer (Rep.), of Yonkers; Frances T. Sullivan (Republican), of Fulton; and Helene Weinstein (Democrat), a lawyer of Brooklyn—were re-elected. Nellie R. Santiago (Democrat), of Brooklyn; and Mary Ellen Jones (Dem.), of Irondequoit, were also elected to the State Senate. RoAnn Destito (Democrat), of Rome; Donna Ferrara (Republican), a lawyer of Westbury; Sandy Galef (Dem.), of Ossining; Eileen Hickey (Dem.), a registered nurse of Rhinebeck; Audrey Hochberg (Democrat), of Scarsdale; Elizabeth C. Hoffman (Rep.), of North Tonawanda; and Naomi C. Matusow (Democrat), a lawyer of Armonk; were also elected to the Assembly.

On February 16, 1993, Chloe Ann O'Neil (Rep.), an elementary school teacher of Parishville, was elected to fill a vacancy in the Assembly.

The New York state election, 1993, was held on November 2. Two vacancies in the State Senate and two vacancies in the Assembly were filled. Mary Lou Rath (Rep.), of Williamsville, was elected to fill one of the vacancies in the Senate; and Patricia Acampora (Rep.), of Mattituck, was elected to fill one of the vacancies in the Assembly.

On February 15, 1994, Melinda Katz (Lib.), a lawyer of Queens; and Carmen E. Arroyo (Dem.), of the Bronx; were elected to fill vacancies in the Assembly. Thus the 190th Legislature ended having 39 women members, surpassing the previous record of 28 in the 189th New York State Legislature (1991–1992).

Sessions
The Legislature met for the first regular session (the 216th) at the State Capitol in Albany on January 6, 1993; and recessed indefinitely on July 8.

Saul Weprin (Dem.) was re-elected Speaker of the Assembly.

Ralph J. Marino (Rep.) was re-elected Temporary President of the Senate.

On February 18, 1993, State Comptroller Edward Regan (Rep.) tendered his resignation, effective April 30. On May 5, the Legislature elected Carl McCall (Dem.) to fill the vacancy, with a vote of 121 to 2, the Republicans boycotting the election.

On September 8, 1993, Attorney General Robert Abrams (Dem.) tendered his resignation, effective December 31. The Legislature met again in November and December. On December 16, 1993, Assemblyman G. Oliver Koppell was elected by the Legislature to fill the vacancy.

The Legislature met for the second regular session (the 217th) at the State Capitol in Albany on January 5, 1994; and recessed indefinitely on July 3.

On January 19, Speaker Weprin suffered a stroke, and was hospitalized. On January 24, 1994, Sheldon Silver (Dem.) was elected as Interim Speaker. Weprin died on February 11, and Silver was subsequently elected as Speaker.

State Senate

Senators
The asterisk (*) denotes members of the previous Legislature who continued in office as members of this Legislature. George E. Pataki and Michael F. Nozzolio changed from the Assembly to the Senate.

Note: For brevity, the chairmanships omit the words "...the Committee on (the)..."

Employees
 Secretary: Stephen F. Sloan

State Assembly

Assembly members
The asterisk (*) denotes members of the previous Legislature who continued in office as members of this Legislature.

Note: For brevity, the chairmanships omit the words "...the Committee on (the)..."

Employees
 Clerk: Francine Misasi

Notes

Sources
 The 1992 Elections – New York Legislature – Incumbency Keeps Balance Intact by Sam Howe Verhovek, in The New York Times on November 5, 1992
 Weprin Picks Leadership Of Committees by James Dao, in The New York Times on January 12, 1993

190
1993 establishments in New York (state)
1994 disestablishments in New York (state)
1993 politics in New York (state)
1994 politics in New York (state)
1993 U.S. legislative sessions
1994 U.S. legislative sessions